Chris Nybo (born April 30, 1977) is an American attorney and politician who is a former Republican member of the Illinois Senate. He represented the 24th District. Previously, he had been a member of the Illinois House of Representatives, representing the 41st District from 2011 to 2013.

Career

Nybo received a B.A. from Dartmouth College and a J.D. from the University of Chicago Law School. Nybo was a recipient of a Harry S. Truman Scholarship. He previously served as an Elmhurst, Illinois alderman. Nybo was selected as an Illinois Rising Star in 2010, 2011, and 2012. Nybo served on the following committees: Mass Transit; Consumer Protection; Environment & Energy; Transportation, Regulation, Roads; and Tollway Oversight.

In 2012, Nybo ran for election to the 24th District seat in the Illinois State Senate. He faced incumbent and fellow Republican Kirk Dillard in the primary on March 20, 2012, but lost.

In 2013, Nybo began a second run for the Illinois Senate being vacated by Kirk Dillard and defeated fellow Republican Dennis Reboletti in the primary. In August, he was appointed to this same seat when Dillard resigned to become Chairman of the RTA.

In 2018, he was narrowly defeated by Suzy Glowiak, conceding the race on November 10, 2018.  Nybo then resigned from his seat on November 15, 2018 and was replaced by Yadav Nathwani.

Personal life

Nybo and his wife Faye have three children, Connor, Olivia, and Allison.

Electoral history

References

External links
Senator Chris Nybo (R) 24th District at the 98th Illinois General Assembly
By session: 98th, 97th
Senator Chris Nybo - constituency site
Chris Nybo - campaign website

Living people
Dartmouth College alumni
Illinois lawyers
Republican Party Illinois state senators
Republican Party members of the Illinois House of Representatives
People from Elmhurst, Illinois
University of Chicago Law School alumni
1977 births
21st-century American politicians